was a Japanese waka poet of the mid-Heian period. One of his poems was included in the Ogura Hyakunin Isshu. He produced a private waka collection, the Yoshitaka-shū.

Biography 
Yoshitaka was born in 954, the son of Fujiwara no Koretada.

He was the father of the respected calligrapher Yukinari.　When his father died, Yoshitaka considered ordaining as a Buddhist monk. In the same year his son was born, which dissuaded him from pursuing a religious career.

He died in 974, at age twenty, of smallpox, on the same day as his twin brother.

Poetry 
Twelve of his poems were included in imperial anthologies, and he was listed as one of the Late Classical Thirty-Six Immortals of Poetry.

The following poem by him was included as No. 50 in Fujiwara no Teika's Ogura Hyakunin Isshu:

References

Bibliography 
McMillan, Peter. 2010 (1st ed. 2008). One Hundred Poets, One Poem Each. New York: Columbia University Press.
Suzuki Hideo, Yamaguchi Shin'ichi, Yoda Yasushi. 2009 (1st ed. 1997). Genshoku: Ogura Hyakunin Isshu. Tokyo: Bun'eidō.

External links 
List of Yoshitaka's poems in the International Research Center for Japanese Studies's online waka database.
Minamoto no Yoshitaka on Kotobank.
Fujiwara no Yoshitaka on the Japanese History Database.

954 births
974 deaths
10th century in Japan
10th-century Japanese poets
People of Heian-period Japan
Heian period Buddhists
Fujiwara clan
Japanese nobility
Deaths from smallpox
Infectious disease deaths in Japan
Articles containing Japanese poems
Hyakunin Isshu poets